Agnes Douglas, Countess of Argyll (1574 – 3 May 1607) was a Scottish noblewoman and the first wife of Archibald Campbell, 7th Earl of Argyll. She was the mother of three of his children, including his heir, Archibald Campbell, 1st Marquess of Argyll, the de facto head of the government in Scotland throughout most of the conflict known as the Wars of the Three Kingdoms. Lady Agnes was considered so beautiful that she was described as a "pearl of Lochleven".

Family
Lady Agnes Douglas was born at Lochleven Castle, Scotland, in 1574, one of the eleven children of Sir William Douglas, 6th Earl of Morton, and Agnes Leslie. She had four brothers and six sisters. Lady Agnes and her sisters were so famed for their beauty throughout Scotland that they were known as the "pearls of Lochleven".

Her paternal grandparents were Sir Robert Douglas and Margaret Erskine, a former mistress of King James V of Scotland, and her maternal grandparents were George Leslie, 4th Earl of Rothes, and Margaret Crichton, an illegitimate daughter of Princess Margaret, the youngest sister of King James III. Her half-uncle was James Stewart, Earl of Moray, Regent of Scotland, and the illegitimate son of her grandmother, Margaret, from the latter's liaison with King James V. He was assassinated in 1570.

Before Agnes's birth, from June 1567 until her escape in May 1568, Mary, Queen of Scots, was a prisoner at Lochleven Castle, where her father served as custodian and her mother was the queen's closest female companion. The queen escaped from Lochleven with the aid of George Douglas, Agnes's uncle, and Willy Douglas, a cousin who was resident at the castle.

Her father succeeded to the Earldom of Morton in 1588 as the 6th earl upon the death of his kinsman, Archibald Douglas, 5th Earl of Morton. The title had been forfeited in 1581 when James Douglas, 4th Earl of Morton, regent of Scotland, was executed and attainted for his part in the murder of Henry Stewart, Lord Darnley, in 1567. It was restored to the Douglas family in 1586.

Marriage and children
On 24 July 1592 at Dalkeith Palace, she married, as his first wife, Archibald Campbell, 7th Earl of Argyll, the son of Colin Campbell, 6th Earl of Argyll, and Agnes Keith. Agnes, who was a Roman Catholic, was instrumental in her husband's later decision to convert to the Catholic faith in 1618, eleven years after her death. Despite Agnes's religion, he commanded the royal troops which fought against the Catholic rebels led by George Gordon, 1st Marquess of Huntly, in the Battle of Glenlivet on 3 October 1594. Argyll's forces were defeated by the numerically smaller forces of Huntly.

The marriage produced three children:
 Lady Annabel Campbell (died 1652), married Robert Kerr, 2nd Earl of Lothian, by whom she had two daughters.
 Lady Anne Campbell (died 14 June 1638), married George Gordon, 2nd Marquess of Huntly, by whom she had seven children.
 Archibald Campbell, 1st Marquess of Argyll (April 1607 – 27 May 1661), de facto head of government in Scotland during most of the conflict known as the Wars of the Three Kingdoms, and the most influential member of the Covenanter movement during the English Civil War. In 1626 married Lady Margaret Douglas (1610–1678), by whom he had four children, including his heir, Archibald Campbell, 9th Earl of Argyll. He was executed in 1661 by the orders of King Charles II of England on charges of High Treason. His head was exposed on top of the Tolbooth.

In January 1600 she imprisoned Thomas Alexander of Balruidy in Castle Campbell, who her lawyer and John Archibald, Captain of Castle Campbell, claimed was a sheep rustler.

Agnes died on 3 May 1607, a month after the birth of her only son, Archibald.

She was buried at Kilmun Parish Church. Her husband married secondly, on 30 November 1610, Anne Cornwallis, by whom he had three more children.

Agnes Douglas in art
In 1599, when she was twenty-five years old, Agnes's portrait was painted by Flemish artist Adrian Vanson. It is displayed in the National Gallery of Scotland.

Ancestors

Notes

References
 Antonia Fraser, Mary, Queen of Scots, Dell Publishing Co., Inc., New York, March 1971; originally published by Weidenfeld and Nicolson, London, 1969
 
 Historical Records, Family of Leslie 1067- 1868–69, printed by R. Clark for Edmonston and Douglas, Edinburgh, retrieved on 25 March 2009

1574 births
1607 deaths
Scottish countesses
Scottish Roman Catholics
Burials at the Argyll Mausoleum
16th-century Scottish people
16th-century Scottish women
17th-century Scottish people
17th-century Scottish women
Daughters of Scottish earls